Nawab Abdul Ghani Talpur is a Pakistani politician who was a member of the National Assembly of Pakistan from 2002 to 2013.

Political career
He was elected to the National Assembly of Pakistan from Constituency NA-231 (Dadu-I) as a candidate of Pakistan Peoples Party (PPP) in 2002 Pakistani general election. He received 76,568 votes and defeated Syed Jalal Mehmood Shah.

He was re-elected to the National Assembly from Constituency NA-231 (Jamshoro) as a candidate of PPP in 2008 Pakistani general election. He received 138,320 votes and defeated Syed Jalal Mehmood Shah.

References

Living people
Year of birth missing (living people)
Place of birth missing (living people)
Pakistani MNAs 2008–2013
Pakistani MNAs 2002–2007